Minea is a feminine given name in occasional use in Finland. The name originated in Mika Waltari`s book The Egyptian, in which Minea is a Greek priestess. From 2010 to 2017, it was the given name for 1954 persons in Finland.

References

Feminine given names